Iso lo is a 1994 documentary film.

Synopsis 
A glimpse into Ismaël Lô's musical universe. Shot during one of his tours, this peregrination into Africa's heart directed by Mansour Sora Wade will take us to the sources of his music.

References 

1994 films
French documentary films
1994 documentary films
Senegalese documentary films
1990s French films